The debut album from Cuff the Duke, titled Life Stories for Minimum Wage, was released in 2002 and recorded at Umbrella Sound and at The House of Miracles in Toronto and London, Ontario, Canada. The album was re-released in 2007 on Outside Music.

Track listing
"Blackheart" – 4:55
"Hey Baby" – 2:06
"The Difference Between Us" – 2:58
"Hobo Night Stalker" – 3:59
"Long Winter" – 3:52
"Lonely Path" – 2:07
"Ballad of a Lonely Construction Worker" – 5:23
"Anti-Social" – 3:41
"Head Smashed In Buffalo Jump" – 2:49
"The Trouble and the Truth" – 6:39

A "deluxe edition" of the album was released to iTunes in 2012, featuring two additional tracks not on the original release, "This City Will Eat You" and "Burger". In addition, the band previously distributed "Deciding on Luther", an unreleased track from the original recording sessions for the album, as a free download from its website.

Personnel
Brad Fudge - drums, percussion, artwork
Paul Lowman - bass, guitar, lap steel
Wayne Petti - lead vocals, guitar, harmonica
Jeff Peers - guitar, bells, Moog Opus III, Crumar Stratus, wind organ, Hammond organ
Steve Krecklo - producer, backing vocals, piano, Moog Opus III, guitar, percussion, lap steel
Lorne Hounsell - producer, engineer
Andy Magoffin - producer, engineer (tracks 4 and 7)
Joao Carvalho - mastering

References 

2002 debut albums
Cuff the Duke albums